In mathematics and computational geometry, the Gabriel graph of a set  of points in the Euclidean plane expresses one notion of proximity or nearness of those points. Another way of expressing the same adjacency criterion is that  and  should be the two closest given points to their midpoint, with no other given point being as close. Gabriel graphs naturally generalize to higher dimensions, with the empty disks replaced by empty closed balls. Gabriel graphs are named after K. Ruben Gabriel, who introduced them in a paper with Robert R. Sokal in 1969.

Percolation
For Gabriel graphs of infinite random point sets, the finite site percolation threshold gives the fraction of points needed to support connectivity: if a random subset of fewer vertices than the threshold is given, the remaining graph will almost surely have only finite connected components, while if the size of the random subset is more than the threshold, then the remaining graph will almost surely have an infinite component (as well as finite components).

Related geometric graphs
The Gabriel graph is a subgraph of the Delaunay triangulation. It can be found in linear time if the Delaunay triangulation is given.

The Gabriel graph contains, as subgraphs, the Euclidean minimum spanning tree, the relative neighborhood graph, and the nearest neighbor graph.

It is an instance of a beta-skeleton. Like beta-skeletons, and unlike Delaunay triangulations, it is not a geometric spanner: for some point sets, distances within the Gabriel graph can be much larger than the Euclidean distances between points.

References 

Euclidean plane geometry
Geometric graphs